Nationality words link to articles with information on the nation's poetry or literature (for instance, Irish or France).

Events

Works published

United Kingdom
 Lady Anne Barnard, Auld Robin Gray (ballad) (published anonymously)
 William Blake, Poetical Sketches
 Jane Cave (later, Jane Wiscom), Poems on Various Subjects, Entertaining, Elegiac, and Religious
 Judith Cowper (later, Judith Madan), The Progress of Poetry
 George Crabbe, The Village
 John Hoole translator, Orlando Furioso
 Joseph Ritson, editor, A Select Collection of English Songs, anthology
 John Wolcot, writing under the pen name "Peter Pindar", More Lyric Odes, to the Royal Academicians (Lyric Odes 1782)

Other
 David Humphreys, United States:
 The Glory of America; or Peace Triumphant over War
 Poem on the Industry of the United States of America

Births
Death years link to the corresponding "[year] in poetry" article:
 April 3 – Washington Irving (died 1859), American author, essayist, biographer, historian and poet
 April 21 – Reginald Heber (died 1826), English Anglican bishop, poet and hymn writer
 September 8 – N. F. S. Grundtvig (died 1872), Danish pastor, author, poet, philosopher, historian, teacher and nationalist politician
 September 23 – Jane Taylor (died 1824), English poet and novelist
 December 10 – María Bibiana Benítez (died c.1873), Puerto Rican poet and playwright

Deaths
Birth years link to the corresponding "[year] in poetry" article:
 January 2 – Johann Jakob Bodmer (born 1698), German-language Swiss, author, critic, academic and poet
 January 10 – Phanuel Bacon (born 1700) English clergyman, playwright, poet and author
 July 7 – Magnus Gottfried Lichtwer born 1719), German
 July 15 – Yokoi Yayū 横井 也有, born , and took the pseudonym Tatsunojō (born 1702), Japanese samurai, scholar of Kokugaku and haikai poet
 October 10 – Henry Brooke (born 1703) Irish poet and playwright
 November 23 – Ann Eliza Bleecker (born 1752), American poet and correspondent
 December 12 – John Scott, 53 (born 1731), English poet and friend of Samuel Johnson
 Approximate date – John Seccomb (born 1708), American clergyman and poet

See also

 List of years in poetry
 List of years in literature
 18th century in poetry
 18th century in literature
 French literature of the 18th century
 Sturm und Drang (the conventional translation is "Storm and Stress"; a more literal translation, however, might be "storm and urge", "storm and longing", "storm and drive" or "storm and impulse"), a movement in German literature (including poetry) and music from the late 1760s through the early 1780s
 List of years in poetry
 Poetry

Notes

18th-century poetry
Poetry